Helenodes is a genus of moths of the family Plutellidae.

Species
Helenodes murmurata Meyrick, 1913 (from India)
Helenodes platyacma  Meyrick, 1930 (from Mauritius)

References
Meyrick, 1913 . Exotic Microlepidoptera Vol.1: 151

Plutellidae
Moth genera
Taxa named by Edward Meyrick